Thomas Scott (1739 – March 2, 1796) was an American lawyer and politician who was born in Chester County in the Commonwealth of Pennsylvania.

As he grew up and matured, he opted law as his subject of study which led to his role in the fledgling United States. At about the year 1770, after admission to the bar and subsequent practice of law, he moved to and settled on Dunlaps Creek at Redstone Old Fort(now modern day Brownsville in Fayette County).

When the County of Washington was organized on March 28, 1781, he was made the first prothonotary.  He served in this capacity until March 28, 1789. In addition to this first honor of Washington County, he previously served as a justice of the peace in 1773, and was a member of the first Pennsylvania Assembly in 1776.

However, Scott resigned his position with the Pennsylvania Assembly due to his election to the U.S. House of Representatives.  He arrived on Wednesday, April 1, 1789, for his seat at the first session of the first Congress in the city of New York.  Among his contributions, he purportedly had the honor of presenting to the Congress of the new nation a resolution that established the capital city on the banks of the Potomac River now known as Washington, D.C.

He died on March 2, 1796, and was buried at Old Graveyard in the city of Washington, Pennsylvania, on Walnut Street which is now considered to be the present site of Washington & Jefferson College.  Later in the early 1900s, his body was re-interred in Washington Cemetery.

References

External links
Biographic sketch at U.S. Congress website
The Political Graveyard

1739 births
1796 deaths
Pennsylvania state court judges
Members of the Pennsylvania House of Representatives
Members of the United States House of Representatives from Pennsylvania
People of colonial Pennsylvania
People from Chester County, Pennsylvania
Burials in Pennsylvania
18th-century American politicians